An artifact in the Unified Modeling Language (UML) is the specification of a physical piece of information that is used or produced by a software development process, or by deployment and operation of a system."

Examples of artifacts include model files, source files, scripts, and binary executable files, a table in a database system, a development deliverable, a word-processing document, or a mail message.

Artifacts are the physical entities that are deployed on Nodes (i.e. Devices and Execution Environments). Other UML elements such as classes and components are first manifested into artifacts and instances of these artifacts are then deployed. Artifacts can also be composed of other artifacts.

See also
 Artifact (software development)

References

Unified Modeling Language